Çelebi is a town and district of Kırıkkale Province in the Central Anatolia region of Turkey.

Çelebi, Chelebi or Celebi may also refer to:

People
 Çelebi (title), a Turkish title meaning "gentleman", including a list of people with the title 
 Çelebi (tribe), a Kurdish tribe inhabiting the Mardin Province of southeastern Turkey
 Alpay Çelebi (born 1999), Turkish footballer 
 Asaf Halet Çelebi (1907–1958), Turkish poet
 Hasan Çelebi (born 1937), Turkish calligraphist
 Huseyin Çelebî (1967–1992), Kurdish activist and writer
 Nilgün Çelebi (born 1950), a Turkish academic

Places in Turkey
Çelebi, Karakoçan
Çelebi, Keşan
Çelebi, Kovancılar
Çelebi, Yenişehir
Çelebi Island, an Aegean island

Other uses
Celebi (Pokémon), a Pokémon species

See also
 
 
 
 Celebic (disambiguation)
 Čelebići (disambiguation)
 Noman Çelebicihan (1885–1918), Crimean Tatar leader